List of Provinces of Japan > Saikaido > Satsuma Province > Isa District

Japan > Kyūshū >  Kagoshima Prefecture > Isa District

 was a district located in Kagoshima Prefecture, Japan.

As of October 1, 2008, the district had a population of 8,952 with an area of 100.47 km2.

The district's area is equivalent to the current city of Isa.

Until the day before the dissolution, the district had one town:
 Hishikari (菱刈町)

Timeline
 March 29, 1896 - Isa District was formed when Kitaisa and Hishikari Districts were merged. The villages of Ōkuchi, Yamano, Hatsuki, Hishikari, Nishitara and Higashitara were formed.
 April 1, 1918 - The village of Ōkuchi was elevated to town status to become the town of Ōkuchi. (1 town, 5 villages)
 February 11, 1925 - The village of Higashitara was renamed to the village of Honjō.
 April 29, 1940 - The village of Hishikari was elevated to town status to become the town of Hishikari. (2 towns, 4 villages)
 November 10, 1940 - The village of Yamano was elevated to town status to become the town of Yamano. (3 towns, 3 villages)
 April 1, 1954 - The towns of Ōkuchi and Yamano, and the villages of Nishitara and Hatsuki were merged to create the city of Ōkuchi. (1 town, 1 village)
 July 15, 1954 - The town of Hishikari, and the village of Honjō were merged to create the town of Hishikari. (1 town)
 November 1, 2008 - The town of Hishikari, along with the city of Ōkuchi, was merged to create the city of Isa. Isa District was dissolved as a result of this merger.

See also
List of dissolved districts of Japan

District Isa
Former districts of Kagoshima Prefecture